Vaughanella is a genus of small corals in the family Caryophylliidae.

Species
The World Register of Marine Species includes the following species in the genus :
Vaughanella concinna Gravier, 1915
Vaughanella margaritata (Jourdan, 1895)
Vaughanella multipalifera Cairns, 1995
Vaughanella oreophila Keller, 1981

References

Caryophylliidae
Scleractinia genera